The 1978–79 Divizia C was the 23rd season of Liga III, the third tier of the Romanian football league system.

Team changes

To Divizia C
Relegated from Divizia B
 CFR Pașcani
 Celuloza Călărași
 Minerul Lupeni
 CSU Galați
 Carpați Sinaia
 Armătura Zalău
 CS Botoșani
 Pandurii Târgu Jiu
 Victoria Carei
 Relonul Săvinești
 Prahova Ploiești
 Avântul Reghin

Promoted from County Championship
 Unirea Săveni
 Danubiana Roman
 Hușana Huși
 Carpați Nehoiu
 Metalosport Galați
 Voința Constanța
 Tractorul Viziru
 Arrubium Măcin
 Unirea Bolintin-Vale
 Vâscoza București
 Dinamo Alexandria
 Răsăritul Caracal
 Gloria Drobeta-Turnu Severin
 Bistrița Băbeni
 CIL Blaj
 ICRAL Timișoara
 Tricolorul Beiuș
 Victoria Ineu
 Silvicultorul Maieru
 Viitorul Șimleu Silvaniei
 Construcții Sibiu
 Sticla Târnaveni
 Izvorul Biborțeni
 Mobila Măgura Codlea

From Divizia C
Promoted to Divizia B
 Minerul Gura Humorului
 Constructorul Iași
 Progresul Brăila
 Chimia Brazi
 Șantierul Naval Oltenița
 Viitorul Scornicești
 Drobeta-Turnu Severin
 Minerul Anina
 Înfrățirea Oradea
 Minerul Cavnic
 Poiana Câmpina
 Industria Sârmei Câmpia Turzii

Relegated to County Championship
 ITA Piatra Neamț
 Unirea Siret
 Flacăra Murgeni
 Petrolistul Dărmănești
 Autobuzul Făurei
 Minerul Măcin
 Petrolul Teleajen Ploiești
 Victoria Florești
 Șoimii Tarom București
 IOR București
 Electrodul Slatina
 Petrolul Târgoviște
 Unirea Drobeta-Turnu Severin
 Mecanizatorul Șimian
 IM Orăștie
 Nera Bozovici
 Gloria Arad
 Voința Carei
 CIL Gherla
 Dermata Cluj-Napoca
 Metalul Târgu Secuiesc
 CPL Sfântu Gheorghe
 Constructorul Alba Iulia
 Soda Ocna Mureș

Renamed teams 
Luceafărul Focșani was moved from Focșani to Adjud and was renamed as Luceafărul Adjud.

Unirea Bolintin-Vale was renamed as Petrolul Bolintin-Vale.

Automobilul Curtea de Argeș was renamed as Electronistul Curtea de Argeș.

Bistrița Băbeni was renamed as Forestierul Băbeni.

IUPS Miercurea Ciuc was renamed as Tractorul Miercurea Ciuc.

Izvorul Biborțeni and Metalul Târgu Secuiesc merged, the first one being absorbed by the second one and was renamed as Izvorul Târgu Secuiesc.

Constructorul Arad merged with CFR Arad, the first one being absorbed by the second one and was renamed as CFR Constructorul Arad.

Other changes 
Relonul Săvinești was replaced by IM Piatra Neamț.

Luceafărul I București and Luceafărul II București were teams of juniors training center of Romanian Football Federation and was enrolled directly in the third tier.

League tables

Seria I

Seria II

Seria III

Seria IV

Seria V

Seria VI

Seria VII

Seria VIII

Seria IX

Seria X

Seria XI

Seria XII

See also 
 1978–79 Divizia A
 1978–79 Divizia B
 1978–79 County Championship

References 

Liga III seasons
3
Romania